Idjwi Territory is a territory in South Kivu, Democratic Republic of the Congo. It consists mostly of the island of Idjwi and various small islands on the Congolese side of Lake Kivu.

See also
Idjwi

References

Territories of South Kivu Province